Thomas Duff was an Irish architect.

Thomas Duff may also refer to:

Thomas Duff (businessman), American businessman
Thomas Duff (politician) (1870–1949), Australian politician
Thomas J. Duff, American architect
Thomas Neil Duff (1896–1978), politician in Ontario, Canada
Tom Duff (born 1952), Canadian computer programmer
Tommy Duff (1905–1951), English footballer